Winfield Gordon Gore (June 28, 1913 – January 21, 1987) was an American football halfback. He played two seasons professionally, one with the Los Angeles Bulldogs (for which he was named to the inaugural Pro All-Star Game) and one with the Detroit Lions of the National Football League. He played college football at Southwestern Oklahoma State University and attended Hominy High School in Hominy, Oklahoma. He is sometimes referred to as "Wilfred Gore".

References

External links
Just Sports Stats

1913 births
1987 deaths
Players of American football from Oklahoma
American football halfbacks
Southwestern Oklahoma State Bulldogs football players
Detroit Lions players
People from Clinton, Oklahoma
People from Hominy, Oklahoma